Ella Fitzgerald Sings the Cole Porter Song Book is a 1956 studio double album by American jazz singer Ella Fitzgerald, accompanied by a studio orchestra conducted and arranged by Buddy Bregman, focusing on the songs of Cole Porter.

Background
This was Fitzgerald's first album for the newly created Verve Records (and the first album to be released by the label). Granz decided to have Fitzgerald record well-established popular works becauseI was interested in how I could enhance Ella’s position, to make her a singer with more than just a cult following amongst jazz fans. So I proposed to Ella that the first Verve album would not be a jazz project, but rather a song book of the works of Cole Porter. I envisaged her doing a lot of composers. The trick was to change the backing enough so that, here and there, there would be signs of jazz.Fitzgerald's time on the Verve label would see her produce her most highly acclaimed recordings, at the peak of her vocal powers. This album inaugurated Fitzgerald's Song Book series, each of the eight albums in the series focusing on a different composer of the canon known as the Great American Songbook. The album was recorded February 7–9 and March 27, 1956, in Hollywood, Los Angeles.

Fitzgerald's manager, and the producer of many of her albums, Norman Granz, visited Cole Porter at the Waldorf-Astoria and played him this entire album. Afterwards, Porter merely remarked, "My, what marvelous diction that girl has."

Legacy and achievements
This album was inducted into the Grammy Hall of Fame in 2000, which is a special Grammy award established in 1973 to honor recordings that are at least twenty-five years old, and that have "qualitative or historical significance." In 2003, it was one of 50 recordings chosen by the Library of Congress to be added to the National Recording Registry.

In 2000 it was voted number 490 in Colin Larkin's All Time Top 1000 Albums.

Track listing
All tracks written by Cole Porter, except when noted.

Disc one
Side one
 "All Through the Night" – 3:15
 "Anything Goes" – 3:21
 "Miss Otis Regrets" – 3:00
 "Too Darn Hot" – 3:47
 "In the Still of the Night" – 2:38
 "I Get a Kick Out of You" – 4:00
 "Do I Love You?" – 3:50
 "Always True to You in My Fashion" – 2:48

Side two
"Let's Do It, Let's Fall in Love" – 3:32
 "Just One of Those Things" – 3:30
 "Ev'ry Time We Say Goodbye" – 3:32
 "All of You" – 1:43
 "Begin the Beguine" – 3:37
 "Get Out of Town" – 3:22
 "I Am in Love" – 4:06
 "From This Moment On" – 3:17

Disc two
Side three
 "I Love Paris" – 4:57
 "You Do Something to Me" – 2:21
 "Ridin' High" – 3:20
 "You'd Be So Easy to Love" – 3:24
 "It's All Right with Me" – 3:07
 "Why Can't You Behave?" – 5:04
 "What Is This Thing Called Love?" – 2:02
 "You're the Top" – 3:33

Side four
"Love for Sale" – 5:52
 "It's De-Lovely" – 2:42
 "Night and Day" – 3:04
 "Ace in the Hole" – 1:58
 "So in Love" – 3:50
 "I've Got You Under My Skin" – 2:42
 "I Concentrate on You" – 3:11
 "Don't Fence Me In" – 3:19 (Robert Fletcher, co-lyricist)

1997 reissue, previously unreleased bonus tracks
"You're the Top" (Alternative take) – 2:08
"I Concentrate on You" (Alternative take) – 3:00
"Let's Do It, Let's Fall in Love" (Alternative take) – 5:25

Personnel
Personnel adapted from the liner notes of CD reissue.

Performance
Ella Fitzgerald – vocals
Paul Smith – piano, celeste (on all tracks except 2.11)

Brass and woodwind members(on tracks 1.1–2, 4–5, 8, 10, 13, 16, 2.2–3, 5, 8–13, 15)
Herb Geller – clarinet, alto saxophone
Chuck Gentry – bass clarinet, baritone saxophone
Bud Shank – clarinet, flute, alto saxophone

Additional members on 1.7, 11, 15, 2.1, 6
Bob Cooper – clarinet, oboe, tenor saxophone
Ted Nash – clarinet, flute, tenor saxophone

Additional members on 1.12
Pete Candoli – trumpet
Harry "Sweets" Edison – trumpet
Maynard Ferguson – trumpet
Conrad Gozzo – trumpet

Additional members on 1.12, 2.7 & 14
Milt Bernhart – trombone
Joe Howard – trombone

Lloyd Ulyate – trombone
George Roberts – bass and baritone trombone

Rhythm members(on all tracks except 1.3, 8, 2.2, 8, 12)
Barney Kessel – Guitar
Joe Mondragon – Double bass
Alvin Stoller – Drums, percussion

Rudimental string members(on tracks 1.1–2, 5, 7–8, 11, 13, 15, 2.1–2, 6, 8–13, 15)
Corky Hale – harp
Robert LaMarchina – cello
Edgar Lustgarten – cello

Technical
Buddy Bregman – arranger, conductor
Norman Granz – producer

Reissue
Suha Gur – mastering
Michael Lang – producer
Fred W. Meyer – mastering

Release history

References

External links
Buddy Bregman's memories of working with Ella on the Cole Porter Song Book

1956 albums
Ella Fitzgerald albums
Verve Records albums
United States National Recording Registry recordings
Albums arranged by Buddy Bregman
Albums produced by Norman Granz
Grammy Hall of Fame Award recipients
Cole Porter tribute albums
Albums conducted by Buddy Bregman
United States National Recording Registry albums